KDGZ-LP (98.3 FM) is a radio station licensed to Townsend, Montana, United States. The station is currently owned by Townsend K12 School District #1.

References

External links
 

DGZ-LP
DGZ-LP